Church Higher Primary School, Belthangady is a coeducational Kannada medium primary school and aided by state govt located in the locality of Belthangady, Karnataka,  India, next to Most Holy Redeemer Church, Belthangady. Church Higher Primary School is run by Most Holy Redeemer Church, Belthangady parish. The school was started by Fr John G. Pinto in 1940 and the school building was constructed during the tenure of Fr. Rosario Fernandes in 1949.

History
Being one of the oldest school in and around Belthangady, it was started by Fr John G. Pinto in 1940 according to the records in Department of Woman and Child Development Karnataka. The school building was constructed during the tenure of Fr. Rosario Fernandes in 1949.

Significance
Though the school was started as Kannada medium from class 1 to class 7 in the beginning, the school management which is Most Holy Redeemer Church, Belthangady has made many developments and has started additional institutions.

In 2005, the school management has started new English medium school called Holy Redeemer Higher Primary School. This school was unaided by Government of Karnataka.

Also in 2012, the parish started Holy Redeemer High School with English as medium of instruction. Due to this there was a conflict between parish committee and the management of St. Theresa High School, Belthangady which is run by nuns of Ursuline Franciscan Congregation. Currently both the schools are running successfully.

These schools have complete infrastructures with computer educations and very good teaching staff.

Events
Every year on December the 7th school celebrates the annual day with lot of activities and sports.

On August 11, 2015, the school hosted the Belthangady taluk level 19th Annual Environment Competition and Prize Distribution event partnering with  Nagarik Seva Trust.

On November 7, 2014, the school hosted a free health checkup for women.

See also
St. Theresa High School, Belthangady
Most Holy Redeemer Church (Belthangady)
Deanery of Belthangady
Belthangady
Monsignor Ambrose Madtha

References

Catholic schools in India
Christian schools in Karnataka
Schools in Dakshina Kannada district
Educational institutions established in 1940
1940 establishments in India